RFA Resurgent (A280) was an armament support ship of the Royal Fleet Auxiliary.
Built by Scotts of Greenock as Changchow, a cargo/passenger liner for the China Navigation Co. Made redundant by the Communist victory in 1949, Changchow and her sistership Chungking (later ) were chartered to the French « Messageries Maritimes », for the Marseilles-Sydney line, via Panama.
Purchased by the Admiralty and chartered out to British India until 1957. 
In 1956-1957, under the name Resurgent, she was again chartered to the « Messageries Maritimes », making trips to New Caledonia and Australia. After that, she was converted to an armament store issuing ship and entered RFA service.

In 1975 she took part in the Joint Services Expedition to Danger Island (JSDI). Small, rocky, Resurgent Island, which had  emerged after the naming of the Three Brothers in the 18th century, was named after the RFA Resurgent which supported the scuba diving scientific research expedition to the area.

She served until 1979, sailing from Rosyth in tow for demolition in Spain on 5 May 1981.

References

Ships of the Royal Fleet Auxiliary
1950 ships